Joseph Jean Baptiste Pusie (October 15, 1910 – April 21, 1956)  was a Canadian professional ice hockey player, boxer and wrestler. Pusie played parts of five seasons in the National Hockey League with the Montreal Canadiens, New York Rangers, and the Boston Bruins between 1930 and 1936. He won the Stanley Cup in 1931 with the Canadiens, playing three out of five games in the Stanley Cup Finals. Pusie's name was left off the Cup, even though he officially qualified.

Pusie scored his only NHL for the Boston Bruins.  It occurred on November 24, 1934 in Boston's 4-1 victory over the St. Louis Eagles.

Pusie was born in Montreal, Quebec but grew up in Chambly, Quebec. He played for 21 different teams in various minor leagues around North America and changed teams 28 times. He was known for his antics. His professional career lasted from 1929 to 1943.

Career statistics

Regular season and playoffs

References

External links

1910 births
1956 deaths
Boston Bruins players
Boston Cubs players
Boston Tigers (CAHL) players
Canadian ice hockey defencemen
Cleveland Barons (1937–1973) players
Detroit Olympics (IHL) players
Ice hockey people from Quebec
London Tecumsehs players
Montreal Canadiens players
New York Rangers players
People from Chambly, Quebec
Philadelphia Arrows players
Providence Reds players
St. Louis Flyers (AHA) players
Seattle Olympics players
Stanley Cup champions
Vancouver Lions players